Charles Dewey Hilles (June 23, 1867 – August 27, 1949) was a politician from the U. S. state of New York.

Biography 
Hilles was born in Belmont County, Ohio to Samuel and Elizabeth (Lee) Hilles.  In 1896 he married Dollie Bell Whiley; they had three children, including the English literature scholar Frederick W. Hilles.  He was also a member of Loyal Legion and the Republican Party .

From 1880 to 1902, he was financial officer and superintendent of the Boys' Industrial School of Ohio. From 1902 to 1909 he was superintendent of the New York Juvenile Asylum (now Children's Village), becoming president of this institution. He was Assistant Secretary of the United States Treasury in 1909, but resigned in 1911 to become private secretary to U. S. President William H. Taft where he served until 1912.

He then served as chairman of the Republican National Committee from 1912 to 1916.  He was a New York delegate to the Republican National Conventions of 1916, 1920, 1924, 1928, 1932 and 1940.  He served as a regular member of the RNC from New York 1924–38.  In 1933 he was a delegate to the New York convention to ratify the 21st Amendment which ended prohibition.

In 1949 Hilles suffered a stroke and died two months later in Speonk, New York.  His wife also died the same year.  His remains were cremated.

Notes

References
Political Graveyard

External links
 
Charles Dewey Hilles papers (MS 281). Manuscripts and Archives, Yale University Library.

1867 births
1949 deaths
New York (state) Republicans
Personal secretaries to the President of the United States
Republican National Committee chairs
People from Belmont County, Ohio